Rojay Smith (born 21 September 1996) is a Jamaican footballer who plays as a forward for USL League One club Forward Madison FC.

Career
Smith began playing with Jamaican National Premier League side Harbour View, before heading to the United States to play college soccer at Northern Oklahoma College in 2016 and 2017, where he scored 33 goals in 37 appearances. Smith also returned to Harbour View in 2017 during the college off season.

In 2018, Smith transferred to the University of Tampa, where he played two seasons, scoring 8 goals and tallying 7 assists in 27 appearances.

On 26 April 2021, Smith signed with USL Championship side Sporting Kansas City II. He made his debut on 1 May 2021, appearing as a 76th-minute substitute during a 2–0 loss to FC Tulsa.

Following the 2021 season, Kansas City opted to declined their contract option on Smith.

Smith signed with Forward Madison of USL League One on January 17, 2022.

References

External links
 Tampa profile
 

1996 births
Living people
Jamaican footballers
Jamaican expatriate footballers
Jamaican expatriate sportspeople in the United States
Expatriate soccer players in the United States
Association football forwards
Harbour View F.C. players
Tampa Spartans men's soccer players
Sporting Kansas City II players
Forward Madison FC players
USL Championship players
People from Saint Catherine Parish
Northern Oklahoma College alumni
USL League One players